Michael Simon Brindley Bream Beuttler (13 April 1940 – 29 December 1988) was a British Formula One driver who raced privately entered March cars. He was born in Cairo, Egypt, the son of Colonel Leslie Brindley Bream Beuttler, Duke of Wellington's Regiment, O.B.E., and a descendant on his mother's side of the Scottish ornithologist William Robert Ogilvie-Grant, grandson of the 6th Earl of Seafield.
  
He was a talented Formula Three driver from the late 1960s, who then graduated to Formula Two and then to Formula One in 1971.

The finance for the team came from a group of stockbroker friends from whom the team took its name – at first Clarke-Mordaunt-Guthrie Racing, and in 1973 it became Clarke-Mordaunt-Guthrie-Durlacher Racing. This approach of funding the team earned his car the nickname of the "Stockbroker Special".

He raced on one occasion, at the 1971 Canadian Grand Prix, for the works March team. Beuttler's best result was a seventh place in the 1973 Spanish Grand Prix.

While Beuttler did not achieve a points-scoring finish during his career in Formula One, he did achieve five top-ten finishes in the 28 races in which he competed, results that would have delivered points by today's championship regulations.

When his backers suffered amid the 1973 oil crisis, Beuttler retired from racing the following year, at the age of 34, after competing in the 1000 km of Brands Hatch.

Personal life
Beuttler is often described as the first openly gay Formula One driver, although former Autosport editor and friend Ian Phillips has described Beuttler as "semi-closeted", adding "I'm not sure anybody really knew. We all just kind of suspected it. Because people weren’t open about being gay in those days and he took this lovely girlfriend to all the races which I suspect was just to distract because people didn’t come out as being gay in those days." Beuttler remains the only known LGBT+ male driver to have raced at that level to this day.

While little is known about Beuttler's life after his career in motorsport, he eventually moved to the United States, where he died of complications resulting from AIDS in 1988, in Los Angeles, aged 48.

Beuttler was also the brother-in-law of politician Alan Clark, who had married Beuttler's sister Jane.

Complete Formula One results
(key)

References

 Philippe Vogel et le sport automobile (French)
 mikebeuttler.hautetfort.com/
 www.comultipress.fr/spip/spip.php?article165

1940 births
1988 deaths
English racing drivers
English Formula One drivers
March Formula One drivers
European Formula Two Championship drivers
AIDS-related deaths in California
World Sportscar Championship drivers
Gay sportsmen
English LGBT sportspeople
Sportspeople from Cairo
LGBT racing drivers
20th-century British LGBT people